The Arts Promotion Centre Finland is an expert and service agency for promoting the arts in Finland. Arts Promotion Centre Finland is organized under the Ministry of Education and Culture.

The Arts Promotion Centre Finland together with its arts councils and boards awards grants to professional artists and subsidies to communities in the field of the arts.

References

External links
 Arts Promotion Centre Finland Homepage 

Arts councils
Finnish culture
Civic and political organisations of Finland